Teasing Master Takagi-san is an anime series adapted from the manga of the same title by Sōichirō Yamamoto. The first season was directed by Hiroaki Akagi and animated by Shin-Ei Animation, with scripts written by Michiko Yokote and character designs by Aya Takano. It aired from January 8 to March 26, 2018, on Tokyo MX and other channels. Crunchyroll simulcasted the series, while Funimation streamed the series with an English dub. It ran for 12 episodes. The opening theme is  performed by Yuiko Ōhara. An OVA episode was bundled with the manga's ninth volume, which was released on July 12, 2018.


Episode list

Notes

References

External links
  
 

1
2018 Japanese television seasons